The eighth series of the children's television series Hi-5 aired between 12 June 2006 and 11 August 2006 on the Nine Network in Australia. The series was produced by Kids Like Us for Nine with Helena Harris as executive producer. 

This was the last series to feature Kathleen de Leon Jones as a regular cast member.

Cast

Presenters
 Kellie Crawford – Word Play
 Kathleen de Leon Jones – Puzzles and Patterns
 Nathan Foley – Shapes in Space
 Tim Harding – Making Music
 Charli Robinson  – Body Move

Episodes

Home video releases

Notes

References

External links
 Hi-5 Website

2006 Australian television seasons